Carl G. von Iwonski (1830–1912) was a painter born in Germany who became a naturalized American citizen.  He was artistically active in San Antonio and New Braunfels, and best known  for his portraits of Texas pioneers.

Early life
Carl G. von Iwonski was born April 23, 1830 at Hilbersdorf, Saxony, to former Prussian Army officer Leopold von Iwonski and his wife Marie (Kalinowska-Tshirski) von Iwonski. At age 15, he emigrated with his family to Texas with the Adelsverein settlers, disembarking at Galveston on December 18, 1845, from the Johann Detthard .

The family initially settled at Castell and Mill streets in New Braunfels.  Leopold von Iwonski sold his 320-acre land grant and moved the family across the Guadalupe River from New Braunfels, to a settlement which came to be known as Neighborsville.  The Iwonski home was on the Old San Antonio Road and doubled as a stage stop. Young Carl helped out on the family farm, and became a naturalized American citizen in 1854. His first known artistic effort was an 1853 sketch of the family's log cabin.

New Braunfels
Iwonski's first known sketch books date to 1855, coinciding with his opening a studio in New Braunfels. His preferred media were pencil, ink, watercolor. He also made oil portraits of German settlers, and later became skilled as a sculptor.  When Duke Paul Wilhelm of Württemberg visited New Braunfels on an 1855 visit, Iwonski made him a gift of six pencil sketches of his Texas creations. From 1855 to 1857, he made a series of sketches of the New Braunfels Amateur Theater.

San Antonio
Iwonski moved to San Antonio in 1857 and in 1859 became associated with artist William DeRyee.  Iwonski began making sketches of troops stationed in the south Texas area during the Civil War.  His most famous was The Terry's Rangers.  He also became a teacher at the Bickler German-English Academy. From 1866 to 1870, Iwonski ran a San Antonio photography studio with fellow artist Hermann Lungkwitz. In addition to his portraits, he began painting landscapes.

During Reconstruction, Carl von Iwonski became San Antonio city tax collector, and his father Leopold became Bexar County treasurer. Both father and son become radical leaders in the local Republican party, and Carl began to draw political cartoons.  Leopold von Iwonski died in office on October 15, 1872.

Iwonski took a sabbatical in 1871 to study at the Berlin Academy of Art.

Personal life and death
Carl G. von Iwonski never married. In 1873, he accompanied his widowed mother back to Germany and remained there the rest of his life. He died in Breslau on April 4, 1912.

Selected works

Log Cabin, New Braunfels (Iwonski family home) (1853)
Sketches of the New Braunfels Amateur Theater (1855–1857)
New Braunfels Germania Gesangverein (1857)
Alexander von Humboldt (1859)
The Terry Rangers (1862)
German general staff during the Franco-Prussian War (1871)

Portraits
Sam Houston
 Delaware chief John Conner
 Manuel Yturri Sr
José Fermín Cassiano
John Baylor
Johanna and Edward Steves
Dorothea and Carl Hilmar Guenther
Julius Schuetze
Samuel Maverick
Edmund Jackson Davis

References

Further reading
 James Patrick McGuire, Iwonski in Texas: Painter and Citizen, San Antonio Museum Association, San Antonio, 1976

External links

 Biography and appreciation @ the TSHA website.

1830 births
1912 deaths
19th-century American painters
American male painters
19th-century German painters
German male painters
20th-century American painters
20th-century German painters
20th-century American male artists
Artists from Texas
German emigrants to the Republic of Texas
People from Mittelsachsen
Artists from Saxony
People from New Braunfels, Texas
Artists from San Antonio
Painters from Texas
Texas Republicans
Prussian Academy of Arts alumni
19th-century American male artists